The United States Copyright Office (USCO), a part of the Library of Congress, is a United States government body that maintains records of copyright registration, including a copyright catalog. It is used by copyright title researchers who are attempting to clear a chain of title for copyrighted works.

The head of the Copyright Office is the Register of Copyrights. The office is headed by Shira Perlmutter, since October 26, 2020,and currently serves as the official Register.

The Copyright Office is located on the fourth floor of the James Madison Memorial Building of the Library of Congress, at 101 Independence Avenue SE, in Washington, DC.

History
The United States Constitution has provided for establishing a system of extensive copyright laws in the United States. The first federal copyright law, called the Copyright Act of 1790, was enacted in May 1790 (with the first work being registered within two weeks). Originally, claims were recorded by Clerks of U.S. district courts. In 1870, copyright functions were centralized in the Library of Congress under the direction of the then Librarian of Congress - Ainsworth Rand Spofford. The Copyright Office became a separate department of the Library of Congress in 1897, and Thorvald Solberg was appointed the first Register of Copyrights.

In the 1930s, the Copyright Office moved to new quarters in what is now the John Adams Building and in the 1970s it moved again, to its present quarters in the James Madison Memorial Building.

Functions 
The mission of the Copyright Office is to promote creativity by administering and sustaining an effective national copyright system. While the purpose of the copyright system has always been to promote creativity in the society, the functions of the Copyright Office have grown to include the following:

Administering the copyright law 
The Copyright Office examines all applications and deposits presented for registration of new and original and renewal of old copyright claims to determine their acceptability for registration under the provisions of the copyright law. The Office also records documents related to copyright ownership. However, the Copyright Act of 1976 made registration largely optional for copyright ownership. Under the 1976 Act, federal copyright  requires only a fixation of an original work of authorship in a tangible medium of expression. Renewal is not compulsory, and a copyright owner can register at any time. The 1976 Act makes registration a requisite for an infringement action.

The Copyright Office records the bibliographic descriptions and the copyright facts of all works registered. The archives maintained by the Copyright Office are an important record of America's cultural and historical heritage. Containing nearly 45 million individual cards, the Copyright Card Catalog situated in the James Madison Memorial Building is an index to all the copyright registrations in the United States starting from 1870 up to 1977. Records after 1977 are maintained through an online database containing more than 16 million entries.

As a service unit of the Library of Congress, the Copyright Office is part of the legislative branch of the government. The Office provides for a copyright policy too, to advice the Congress. At the request of the Congress, the Copyright Office advises and assists the Congress in the development of national and international copyright policy; drafts legislation; and prepares technical studies on copyright-related matters.

The Compendium of U.S. Copyright Office Practices manual documents the Copyright Office's practices in its administration of copyright law.

A new fee schedule for Copyright Office services was made effective from March 20, 2020 onwards. Before that, the Copyright office's fees were last updated in 2014. The revised fees increased only for certain registration and recording services, along with some associated services, while other services did not see a fee increase. In May 2014, the Office had reduced some renewal application and addendum fees in an effort to "encourage the filing of more renewal claims" and thereby help improve public records about copyright ownership. In 2020, the fees for a renewal application were increased while the addendum fee remains the same.

Providing information services to the public 

The Copyright Office provides public information and reference services concerning copyrights and recorded documents. The public can keep up on the developments in the Copyright Office by subscribing to the U.S. Copyright Office NewsNet, a free electronic mailing list that issues periodic email alerts to subscribers regarding hearings, deadlines for comments, new and proposed regulations, new publications, and other copyright-related subjects of interest.

Library of Congress
In 1870, Congress passed a law that centralized the copyright system in the Library of Congress. This law required all owners of copyrights of publicly distributed works to deposit in the Library two copies of every such work registered in the United States, whether it is a book, pamphlet, map, print, or piece of music. Supplying the information needs of the Congress, the Library of Congress has become the world's largest library and the de facto national library of the United States. This repository of more than 162 million books, photographs, maps, films, documents, sound recordings, computer programs, and other items has grown largely through the operations of the copyright system, which brings deposits of every copyrighted work into the Library.

Duties 
The Copyright Office consults with interested copyright owners, industry and library representatives, bar associations, and other interested parties on issues related to the copyright law.

The Copyright Office promotes improved copyright protection for U.S. creative works abroad through its International Copyright Institute. Created within the Copyright Office by Congress in 1988, the International Copyright Institute provides training for high-level officials from developing and newly industrialized countries and encourages development of effective intellectual property laws and enforcement overseas.

The website has information about new copyright relevant legislation and a list of designated agents under the Digital Millennium Copyright Act (DMCA) and the Online Copyright Infringement Liability Limitation Act (OCILLA) and information about Copyright Arbitration Royalty Panel (CARP) system of ad hoc copyright royalty arbitrators (now being phased out and replaced by the Copyright Royalty Board).

See also

Copyright Catalog

References

External links

 
 Copyright Office in the Federal Register
 United States Copyright Office, A Brief Introduction and History
 Early Copyright Records Collection at the Library of Congress
 
 
 

 
Copyright Office
Copyright agencies
Copyright Office
United States copyright law
Government agencies established in 1897
Articles containing video clips